In the 1890s, the state of Montana held a referendum to select its capital city. The first round was held in 1892 between several cities, and since none won outright, a second round was held in 1894. After an expensive and negative campaign, Helena was selected as the capital over Anaconda by a margin of around 2,000 votes (3.6 percent).

Background 
In 1891, Montana legislators passed a bill to select a capital city by referendum in the general election of 1892; if no city were to win a majority, then a second referendum would be held in 1894. The cities of Anaconda, Boulder, Bozeman, Butte, Deer Lodge, Great Falls, and Helena (then the temporary capital) entered the 1892 referendum after collecting enough signatures from residents. In the first round, Boulder received 295 votes; Deer Lodge, 983; Great Falls, 5,049; Bozeman, 7,685; Butte, 7,752; Anaconda, 10,183; and Helena, 14,010. As no city won the referendum outright, the two cities with the highest share of the vote—Helena and Anaconda—were entered to compete in the general election of 1894.

Campaign 

Both Helena and Anaconda were problematic cities for voters. Where Helena, as the temporary capital, had been embroiled in political dysfunction, Anaconda was perceived as a working-class, industrial city under the control of Marcus Daly and his corporations. 

During the campaign season of September and October 1894, newspaper editorials in favor of a city were printed, and political memorabilia—including campaign buttons and banners—were minted. Organizations to promote cities were formed, and rallies were held to distribute campaign materials. Negative campaigning was prominent, with supporters of Helena decrying Anaconda as a socially inferior city that was beheld to a corporate business class, and with Anaconda supporters condemning Helena as a pretentious city of politics that did not possess a meaningful economy. Butte's Populist Tribune, for instance, framed the referendum as a question of accepting "Helena dictatorship" over the people, and Helena's Colored Citizen warned that Anaconda was ruled by the same interests that "has always crushed out the black man from every factory or workshop". 

There were far fewer women in Anaconda than in Helena—supporters of its bid thought the settlement of women was beneficial because it could harbor a permanent population, but opponents believed it produced effeminate men. Helena's Social Supremacy, a satirical pamphlet that sought to debase Helena's image, said that where the city consumed 17,669 Manhattan cocktails daily, Anaconda consumed just 127; where Helena had 774 "ladies with poodle dogs", Anaconda had none; and where Helena possessed 1,343 "skeletons in closets", Anaconda possessed 16.

Results 
In November 1894, Helena was chosen over Anaconda by a margin of around 2,000 votes: Helena received 27,024 votes (51.8% of the total), and Anaconda received 25,118 (48.2%). The total cost for the campaigns was between $1 and $2 million, in part because of their elaborate campaign strategies—which included fireworks, memorabilia, and coins. One of the prominent campaigners for Helena's bid, William A. Clark, reportedly celebrated the results by purchasing Helena's residents drinks at a cost of $30,000.

Notes and references

Notes

Citations

Bibliography

 
 
 
 
 

 

1894 Montana elections
1894 referendums
Montana ballot measures
1890s in American politics
Helena, Montana